The 2023 CMT Music Awards, the 57th edition of the awards ceremony, will be held in Austin, Texas, on April 2, 2023, at the Moody Center. The ceremony will be hosted by Kelsea Ballerini and Kane Brown, and will air on CBS and stream on Paramount+.

Background 
The CMT Music Awards is country music's only entirely fan-voted awards show. This will be the second ceremony following the ceremonies move to CBS. Carrie Underwood, Kane Brown and Katelyn Brown have been announced as the first performers for the ceremony.

On March 27 the number of nominees for Video of the Year will shift to only six nominees.

Nominees 
Nominees were announced on March 8, 2023.

References 

2023 music awards
2023 awards in the United States
CMT Music Awards
April 2023 events in the United States
2023 in Texas
2020s in Austin, Texas